Mejdi Schalck is a French sport climber. He won the bronze medal in the men's lead event at the 2022 World Games. Schalck also competed at the 2022 European Championships in the multi-sport tournament of the 2022 IFSC Climbing European Championships, finishing 4th the men's boulder event and 15th in the men's lead.

See also
List of grade milestones in rock climbing
History of rock climbing
Rankings of most career IFSC gold medals

References

External links 

Living people
Place of birth missing (living people)
Year of birth missing (living people)
French rock climbers
World Games bronze medalists
Competitors at the 2022 World Games